The Niagara Regional Council is the governing body of the Regional Municipality of Niagara in Ontario, Canada. Council meets at Niagara Region Headquarters in Thorold, Ontario.

The council consists of a regional chair, the mayors of all twelve Niagara Regional municipalities, and eighteen additional regional councillors elected to represent the various municipalities.  Councillors are elected to four year terms, with the next election to be held in October 2018.

Unlike municipal councils within the Niagara Region, the regional chair is elected by regional council, and not directly by residents of the region.  Any elector within the Niagara Region may be elected chair by council, although regional policy requires that the regional chair will be elected from among the 30 persons who have been elected to regional council in the just completed municipal elections.  Once elected, the regional chair must resign her/his seat as a councillor representing a municipality. That municipality council then determines how the replacement councillor will be chosen.

Council members

References

External links

Politics of the Regional Municipality of Niagara
County and regional councils in Ontario